Henry Seymour, Lord Beauchamp (c. 1626 – 14 March 1654) was an English nobleman, third son of William Seymour, 2nd Duke of Somerset.

He had two elder brothers, but they both died unmarried in their twenties, so that in 1646, when he was about twenty, Henry became heir to his father and took his courtesy title of Lord Beauchamp.

On 28 June 1648, he married Mary Capell at Hadham Parva in Hertfordshire; they had one son and one daughter. Like his father, he was a Cavalier, for which he was imprisoned in the Tower of London during the Commonwealth, 9 April to 9 September 1651, being released on £10,000 bond. He died 14 March 1654 and was buried at Bedwyn Magna 30 March, having died at "Tilsy" according to the burial record in the parish register.

His widow married in 1657 Lord Herbert, later created the 1st Duke of Beaufort.

His children were:
William Seymour, 3rd Duke of Somerset (1654–1671)
Lady Elizabeth Seymour (c. 1655 – 1697); she was granted the style and rank of daughter of a duke on 28 June 1672, and married Thomas Bruce, 2nd Earl of Ailesbury, on 31 August 1676.  On her brother's death without issue, she became heiress of the estates of Tottenham and Savernake Forest, Wiltshire, and she also became representative as senior coheir (heir of line) of Princess Mary Tudor, through the families of Grey and Brandon.

Ancestry

References 

1626 births
1654 deaths
British courtesy barons and lords of Parliament
Cavaliers
Heirs apparent who never acceded
Henry
Younger sons of dukes